Chase Koepka (born January 30, 1994) is an American professional golfer who plays for LIV Golf. He is the younger brother of Brooks Koepka, who is also a professional golfer. His great uncle is Major League Baseball player Dick Groat.

Koepka attended the University of South Florida from 2012 to 2016, winning four tournaments in his college career.

Koepka turned professional in the middle of 2016 and played on the Challenge Tour in the latter part of the year with little success. He played on the tour again in 2017 and had much more success. He finished in the top-10 on five occasions, including being runner-up in the Italian Challenge and the Kazakhstan Open, and finished the season 9th in the Order of Merit to earn a place on the European Tour for 2018. He teamed with his brother Brooks in the 2017 Zurich Classic of New Orleans, the pair finishing tied for 5th.

Koepka started 2018 well, finishing tied for 7th place in the BMW SA Open but thereafter failed to finish in the top 20 of any European Tour event and finished 182nd in the Order of Merit. In 2019, Koepka played on the Challenge Tour but only made the cut three times in 12 events. He also made an attempt to qualify for the Korn Ferry Tour in both 2020 and 2021.

In 2022, Koepka joined LIV Golf.

Amateur wins
2013 Rees Jones Invitational, AutoTrader.com Collegiate
2014 Invitational at the Ocean Course
2016 Mission Inn Spring Spectacular

Playoff record 
Challenge Tour playoff record (0–1)

See also
2017 Challenge Tour graduates

References

External links

American male golfers
South Florida Bulls men's golfers
European Tour golfers
LIV Golf players
Golfers from Florida
People from West Palm Beach, Florida
People from Jupiter, Florida
1994 births
Living people
21st-century American people